Pooja Bedi (born 11 May 1970) is an Indian actress, television talk show host and newspaper columnist. She is the daughter of Indian actors Kabir Bedi and Protima Bedi. She participated in the reality television shows Jhalak Dikhhla Jaa, Nach Baliye, Fear Factor: Khatron Ke Khiladi and Bigg Boss.

Life and career

Early life and career beginnings (1970–2006)
Pooja Bedi was born in Bombay (present-day Mumbai) to the late Indian classical dancer Protima and film star Kabir Bedi. she is of Punjabi Sikh and British ancestry on her father's side and Bengali and Haryanvi ancestry on her mother's side. She was brought up in what she calls a bohemian progressive artistic environment.

From 1991 to 1995, Bedi worked in Bollywood films and appeared in many commercials and campaigns. She is remembered for the KamaSutra condom campaign which she endorsed and used as a vehicle to raise awareness of AIDS.

She made her film debut with Jag Mundhra's film Vishkanya (1991). She went on to act in Jo Jeeta Wohi Sikander (1992) with Aamir Khan for which she earned a nomination in the Filmfare Award for Best Supporting Actress in 1993. Her other films include Lootere (1993) and Aatank Hi Aatank (1995).

Breakthrough role and debut in reality shows (2006–2011)
In 2000, she compiled and edited Timepass, the memoirs of her mother Protima Bedi. She has been a columnist with the Times of India, the Hindustan Times, and MiD DAY newspapers, and has written articles for numerous publications, including L'officiel, Femina and The Week.

In 2005, Bedi along with Hanif Hilal participated in Nach Baliye. In 2006, Bedi participated in Jhalak Dikhhla Jaa in its first season followed by Fear Factor: Khatron Ke Khiladi. In 2011, Bedi was a celebrity contestant in the fifth season of the Indian version of the reality TV show Big Brother, Bigg Boss. She was evicted after surviving for 8 weeks in the house, which was Day 56 (27 November).

Personal life
Bedi married Farhan Furniturewala a Gujarati Muslim of Parsi and Khoja descent, whom she met in 1990. They were married 6 May 1994 and Bedi converted to Islam upon marriage taking up the name Noorjahan.
They have two children, including Alaya Furniturewala. Bedi and Farhan divorced in 2003.

In February 2019, Bedi became engaged to Maneck Contractor.

Filmography

Television

References

External links 

  
 
 

Indian film actresses
1970 births
Indian women television presenters
Indian television presenters
Living people
Converts to Islam from Sikhism
Female models from Mumbai
Indian television actresses
Actresses in Hindi cinema
Actresses of European descent in Indian films
Lawrence School, Sanawar alumni
Fear Factor: Khatron Ke Khiladi participants
Bigg Boss (Hindi TV series) contestants
Bengali actresses
Actresses from Punjab, India
Indian people of English descent